Ghindești is a town in Florești District, Moldova.

References

Cities and towns in Moldova
Soroksky Uyezd
Florești District